Michael John Wade OBE (born 22 May 1954) is a British insurance executive and political advisor.

Early life
Michael Wade was born in Woking, Surrey, United Kingdom. He is of Parsi Zoroastrian descent; his ancestors formed the Bombay Dockyards for the British East India Company – known as the Wadia family. Today, his distant cousin, Nusli Wadia, runs the family firm the Wadia Group. Wade is a descendant of Ardaseer Wadia, who settled in London during 1839, and became a member of the Royal Society. Michael Wade's grandfather, Mark, Anglicised the British branch of the family name to Wade in 1905.

Wade attended the Dane Court Preparatory School in Pyrford, Surrey, before boarding at the Royal Russell School in Addington, Surrey.

Career
Michael Wade has spent his 40-year career working at Lloyd's in financial services. Over the course of his career, Wade also served in several committees including the Council of Lloyd's – then the regulator of the market – and the Committee of Lloyd's. Also, the Parliamentary Liaison Committee and one of the key influencers in establishing the Lloyd's Taskforce chaired by Sir David Rowland. Most recently, he was appointed a consultant to Brit Insurance. This is the latest in a number of consultancy and non-executive directorships Wade currently holds, with others including TigerRisk Capital Markets & Advisory (UK) and Neon Underwriting (at Lloyd's), as well as Swiss Re.

Prior to this, Wade was Chairman of Optex Group Ltd from 2006 to 2012. When it was sold to Besso, Wade was appointed Executive Chairman of Besso Insurance Group Ltd in 2011 tasked with restructuring equity shareholdings, reducing bank debt and returning the business to profitability. He left the business 2012, selling the 15% stake he purchased a year earlier.

Wade began his career in 1975 at C E Health Underwriting before going to set up Holman Wade Ltd with John Holman & Sons in 1980 at the age of 26 specialising in reinsurance for Members of Lloyd's. The business later merged with H. Clarkson & Co ship-broking group and in 1986 became known as Horace Clarkson, later Clarksons, before listing on the London Stock Exchange. Wade remained a director of the company until 1993 when he left to form Corporate Lloyd's Membership (CLM) with former chairman of British Rail, Sir Peter Parker and Jim Payne, a vice chairman of Sedgwick Group. In 1999, CLM merged with SVB Holdings plc. Wade was appointed Deputy Chairman of the combined group, which was one of the largest Integrated Lloyd's Vehicles listed on the London Stock Exchange, but stepped down in January 2000 to form investment manager Rostrum Group Ltd. As CEO, Wade focused on the Lloyd's listed vehicles and also made investments on behalf of some of the UK's largest pension funds.

His role at Rostrum led to Wade becoming Chairman of Bowood Holdings Ltd before moving on to Optex.

Political History
Michael Wade made in-roads into politics in 2000 when he became a treasurer of the Conservative Party, a role he held until 2010. Since this time, he has gone on to be chairman of Team 1000 and the founder of Donor group Party Patrons.

In May 2012, Wade was a co-founder of the Conservative Friends of Pakistan. He was also Chairman of the group from 2012 to 2015, which focuses on building stronger relationships between the Conservative Party, Pakistan and the British Pakistani community.

Wade was appointed by Robert Jenrick, Secretary of State for Ministry of Housing Communities & Local Government in July 2020 as a senior advisor on the financing of building safety remediation for domestic tower blocks in the UK following the Grenfell Tower disaster. Wade is tasked with working with leaseholders and the financial sector to identify financing solutions to remedy dangerous cladding on high-rise buildings.

This is Wade's second government advisory role, having previously been appointed a Crown Representative tasked with engaging early with suppliers, improving relationships and negotiating the best contracts on behalf of government by Minister for the Cabinet Office Francis Maude in April 2013. He held this role until 2015 when he became a senior advisor to the Cabinet Office. During this time, Wade was involved in the development of Flood Re, which aimed to offer affordable home insurance for those living in areas most at-risk of flooding.

In addition, in 2014, Wade was authorised by the then Chancellor of the Exchequer, George Osborne pursue the notion of bringing Insurance Linked Securities to be domiciled in the UK with the London Market Group. The legislation became law in 2017.

Honours
Wade was awarded an OBE in the Queen's 2018 Birthday Honours for services to Government and the Economy.

Personal life
Michael Wade married Caroline Dashwood, daughter of Sir Francis Dashwood, in 1997 at the Dashwood family estate, West Wycombe Park. They have a son, Alexander Francis Neville Wade (b. 1998) and divorced in 2001.

Wade bought Trafalgar Park, a Grade 1 listed country house near Salisbury, Wiltshire, in 1995. Gifted to the Nelson family by the Crown as reward for Admiral Lord Nelson's victory at Trafalgar, Wade used the property for weddings, events and charity fundraisers and launches, including those for the Wiltshire Air Ambulance. During 2021, Wade listed a restored Trafalgar Park for sale and was sold by October 2021.

Wade is active in supporting a number of charities, including Moorfields Eye Hospital for which he conducted Saint-Saens Symphony No. 3 in C minor, Op. 78, popularly known as the Organ Symphony, at St John's Smith Square in May 2014 as a fundraising event for his 60th birthday and the National Society for Epilepsy. He is also the President of the Wiltshire Victoria County History, a trustee of the Salisbury Girls Choristers Trust and is Honorary Chairman of the London Festival Opera, which combine his philanthropic endeavours with his interest in classical music.

One of Wade's most notable charity endeavours was the creation of the Lloyd's Community Programme more than 30 years ago, of which he was the first chairman.

Wade is a Liveryman at the Worshipful Company of Insurers and also a Freeman of the City of London.

References

External links 

 Official website
 Trafalgar Park website

1954 births
Living people
Parsi people
British people of Parsi descent
British businesspeople in insurance
20th-century British businesspeople
21st-century British businesspeople